Chris D'Alvise (born January 28, 1986) is a Canadian professional ice hockey player who is currently playing for EHC Lustenau in the Austrian National League. His father is Dan D'Alvise, who represented Canada at the 1980 Winter Olympics.

Playing career
D'Alvise played hockey for four years while attending Clarkson University. In November 2010, he signed a professional try-out (PTO) agreement with the Springfield Falcons, after he scored 10 goals and 7 assists in 12 games with the Stockton Thunder of the ECHL. Through his first 28 games in with the Falcons, he has scored 9 goals and 9 assists, while wearing number 9. On January 14, 2011, D'Alvise signed a standard American Hockey League contract with the Falcons.

D'Alvise signed his first European contract with Slovenian club, HDD Olimpija Ljubljana of the Austrian EBEL. After a single season in 2012–13, D'Alvise moved to Austrian rival, Dornbirner EC on June 5, 2013.

Career statistics

Awards and honors

References

External links

1986 births
Living people
Canadian ice hockey centres
Cincinnati Cyclones (ECHL) players
Clarkson Golden Knights men's ice hockey players
Dornbirn Bulldogs players
HDD Olimpija Ljubljana players
Ice hockey people from Ontario
Sportspeople from Mississauga
Springfield Falcons players
Stockton Thunder players